
This is the list of ships built at Hietalahti shipyard in Helsinki, Finland, from yard number 201 until 400.

See also 
 List of ships built at Hietalahti shipyard (1–200)
 List of ships built at Hietalahti shipyard (401 onwards)

Notes

References

Bibliography 

Hietalahti 201